The Australian Mist (formerly known as Spotted Mist) is a breed of cat developed in Australia. It is a cross between the Abyssinian cat, the Burmese cat, and the Australian Tabby cat.

History

This breed was developed in Australia beginning in 1975, by crossing the Burmese, Abyssinian, and miscellaneous domestic short-haired cats to create a short-haired cat with a spotted coat. The name was changed from "Spotted Mist" to "Australian Mist" in 1998, when cats with marbled coats, rather than spots, were accepted as part of the breed.

Physical characteristics

Australian Mists are medium-sized short-haired cats, with a round head and large eyes. The coat is very short and lacks an undercoat. The coat patterns have three aspects: the ground color, which is paler than the pattern; the pattern; and the appearance of wearing a misted veil, caused by random ticking in solid color areas. The legs and tail are ringed or barred, and the face and neck also have lines of color. Their life expectancy is 15–18 years.

Distribution

Most Australian Mist breeders are in Australia; however, there are a few in the UK and USA. Breeding cats have also been sent to Norway and Germany.

Breed acceptance status

The breed is accepted for championship status by the World Cat Federation. It was accepted at championship status in TICA (The International Cat Association) on 1 May 2014. It gained preliminary recognition with the UK's Governing Council of the Cat Fancy in October 2011. The breed is not yet recognized by the Fédération Internationale Féline.

References

External links
Australian Mist from Breed Founder's Nintu Cattery
Australian Mists International. TICA Australian Mist breeder alliance. Info, advice, kitten/stud/breeder list
Australian Mists in TICA (The International Cat Association)
Australian Mist Cat Society
Cat Breeds with Pictures Directory: Australian Mist
UK - The Governing Council of the Cat Fancy Abyssinian Experimental domestic 

Cat breeds
Cat breeds originating in Australia